Tanwarin Sukkhapisit is a Thai filmmaker and politician. In the 2019 Thai general election, they were elected to the Thai parliament representing the Future Forward Party. Tanwarin is a kathoey, and became the first ever openly transgender member of parliament in Thailand's House of Representatives.

Biography 

Tanwarin was born October 23, 1973 in the Nakhon Ratchasima Province. They graduated from Khon Kaen University. After working as an English teacher, Tanwarin entered the entertainment industry as a writer and director.

Removal from office 
In October 2020, the Constitutional Court of Thailand removed Tanwarin from power, finding them guilty of rules barring lawmakers from owning stock in media companies. Tanwarin's removal has been tied to a broader crackdown on Thailand's pro-democracy movement, with one commentator in the Bangkok Post writing that they were "unjustly removed" in a "huge blow to the Thai LGBTI community".

References

External links

1973 births
Bisexual politicians
LGBT legislators
Tanwarin Sukkhapisit
Living people
Tanwarin Sukkhapisit
Tanwarin Sukkhapisit
Tanwarin Sukkhapisit
Transgender politicians
Transgender non-binary people
Non-binary politicians
Tanwarin Sukkhapisit
Tanwarin Sukkhapisit
LGBT film directors
Tanwarin Sukkhapisit